Duisi is a village in Akhmeta Municipality, Georgia. It is situated in the Pankisi Gorge, on the banks of the Alazani river. It is located 640 meters above sea level and 17 kilometers from the city of Akhmeta. In 2014, according to census data, there were 2354 people living in the village.

References

 (in Georgian) მოსახლეობის 2014 წლის საწყველთაო აღწერა (Population Census of 2014). საქართველოს სტატისტიკის ეროვნული სამსახური (ნოემბერი 2014). Access date: 12 February 2018.

Bibliography
(in Georgian) ქართული საბჭოთა ენციკლოპედია (Georgian Soviet Encyclopedia), vol. 3, pg. 650, Tbilisi, 1978.

Populated places in Kakheti